is a train station in the city of Okayama, Okayama Prefecture, Japan.

Lines 
 West Japan Railway Company
 Kibi Line

Railway stations in Okayama Prefecture
Railway stations in Japan opened in 1914
Okayama